Corey Williams (born January 20, 1978) is an American film producer who founded GoldenTiger Productions in 2007. Williams produced the independent drama film TORN and romantic comedy Can't Complain in 2009. In 2010 the independent action film Razorblade City was produced followed by the feature film "King of Baltimore". The short films "The Charl(Y)ie Factor", "Gathering Souls" and "Early Retirement" were completed in 2010. The suspense thriller "Senior CUT Day: The Movie" was completed in 2011 and premiered at the Landmark Theatre on December 8, 2011 in Baltimore, Maryland.

His directorial debut is the 2012 documentary "Indie Film Artists: The DMV Truth" which features twenty individuals who are involved in all aspects of independent films in the Washington DC, Maryland, and Virginia (DMV) area. The documentary premiered at the Landmark Theatre in Baltimore, Maryland on October 25, 2012. The documentary won best documentary at the 2013 The Hot Media International Film Festival. The Documentary has been selected to the Seventh Annual Costa Rica International Film Festival in Montezuma, Costa Rica June 28–30, 2013. Corey produced the feature film Roulette which was written and directed by Erik Kristopher Myers and will be distributed by R-Square Films during the Fall of 2013. Also in 2013, the comedy feature film "6 Nonsmokers" was produced.

Filmography
Asi es la vida – short film (2008): producer, writer (story)
TORN (2009): producer
Can't Complain (2009): producer, writer (story)
Razorblade City (2010): producer
King of Baltimore (2010): producer
The Charl(Y)ie Factor – short film (2010): producer
Gathering Souls – short film (2010): producer
Early Retirement – short film (2010): producer
Senior CUT Day: The Movie (2011): producer
Indie Film Artists: The DMV Truth (2012): director, producer, story
Roulette (2012): producer
6 Nonsmokers (2013): producer
You're Dead! (2014): producer

External links 
http://www.imdb.com/name/nm3559465/
http://www.imdb.com/title/tt1773288/
http://www.imdb.com/title/tt1569543/
http://www.imdb.com/title/tt1547625/
http://www.imdb.com/title/tt1735477/
http://www.imdb.com/title/tt1719701/
http://www.exploreharford.com/news/3062/shot-harford/
http://www.exploreharford.com/news/3371/harford-movies/
https://web.archive.org/web/20110706220013/http://www.maverickentertainment.cc/blog/razorblade-city-on-on-dvd-today
https://web.archive.org/web/20100917111050/http://www.rsquaredfilms.com/films/torn.html
http://www.allmovie.com/dvd/razorblade-city-247372
http://www.allmovie.com/work/torn-500601
https://web.archive.org/web/20110708055619/http://onewaytv.blogspot.com/2010/09/5-coolest-indie-producers-you-need-to.html
https://web.archive.org/web/20110717071136/http://www.tomifilmfestival.com/2010%20TOMI%20FILM%20FESTIVAL%20WINNERS.pdf
http://www.imdb.com/title/tt1754406/
http://www.imdb.com/title/tt1754018/
http://www.imdb.com/title/tt1776904/

https://web.archive.org/web/20180329055222/http://dmvtruthindiefilmartists.com/
http://www.imdb.com/title/tt2229359/

1978 births
Living people
American film producers
Businesspeople from Baltimore